Antalis vulgaris, commonly known as the common tusk shell, is a species of scaphopods mainly encountered on sandy bottoms from 5 to 1000 meters depth.

Description 
Antalis vulgaris is a small mollusc of 3 to 6 cm length with a characteristic elephant tusk shape. Its shell is opaque white and displays closely spaced longitudinal striations on the posterior portion. The anterior aperture (thinnest end) is circular and is occluded by a septum with a central pipe bearing a circular orifice.

Distribution 
The common tusk shell is found from south-western United Kingdom to western Mediterranean.

Behaviour

Diet 
The species stands vertically in soft grounds and search the sand with specific adhesive tentacles (captacula) for small benthic species such as foraminifera.

Reproduction 
Separated sexes. The fecundation is external and gives rise to planktonic larvae called trochophore.

Similar species 

 Antalis entalis (Linnaeus, 1758) is smaller (4cm), has a pyriform-shaped anterior orifice and has no longitudinal striations.

 Fustiaria rubescens (Deshayes, 1825) is smaller (3.5cm) and has a pink coloration. 

 Ditrupa arietina (O. F. Müller, 1776) is an annelid belonging to the polychaete class and living in a calcified conical tube.

References 

Scaphopods
Gastropods described in 1778
Taxa named by Emanuel Mendes da Costa